Saint Andrews Parish is a civil parish in Charlotte County, New Brunswick, Canada, located east of St. Stephen.

The parish lost political significance after county municipalities were abolished in 1966. Local governance in the area is now provided by two entities: the town of Saint Andrews, which includes Navy Island and the Chamcook Local Service District, which includes Ministers Island. The LSD assesses for fire, police, zoning, emergency measures and animal control services. The taxing authority is 513.00 Chamcook. Both the town and the LSD are members of the Southwest New Brunswick Service Commission (SNBSC).

Statistics Canada divides the area into Saint Andrews, Parish, and Saint Andrews, Town.

Origin of name
Historian William F. Ganong notes the use of St. Andrews Point in the Owen Journal of 1770 but considered the name to date back to French times.

Five of the original six mainland parishes of Charlotte County used names of major saints recognised by the Church of England: Andrew (Scotland), David (Wales), George (England), Patrick (Ireland), and Stephen.

History
Saint Andrews Parish was erected in 1786 as one of the county's original parishes, including most of Saint Croix Parish and parts of Saint David and Saint Patrick Parishes.

The local service district of the parish of Saint Andrews comprised all of the parish outside Saint Andrews. It was established in 1970 to assess for fire protection. First aid and ambulance services were added in 1975. It was replaced by Chamcook in 1997.

Boundaries
Saint Andrews Parish is bounded:

 on the north and northeast by a line beginning on the eastern side of Little Chamcook Lake, then running easterly along the northern line of a grant to Amos White to a point about 100 metres east of Mitchell Brook, then east-southeasterly about 500 metres to meet the eastern line of the White grant, then southeasterly along the White grant and the Glebe lot to Birch Cove;
 on the east by Birch Cove, Big Bay, and Passamaquoddy Bay;
 on the south by Passamaquoddy Bay;
 on the west by the St. Croix River and a line running northeasterly along the northern line of the main grant of St. Andrews to near Edwards Corner, then northwesterly about 2.5 kilometres along the rear line of grants on the St. Croix River, then northeasterly to the shore of Chamcook Lake, then counterclockwise along the shore of Chamcook Lake to the mouth of the creek, then northerly along the creek and Little Chamcook Lake to the starting point;
 including Ministers Island and Navy Island.

Evolution of boundaries
Saint Andrews' original eastern boundary ran straight from the original southeastern corner of the Cape Association grant that makes up the northern part of Saint David Parish to join its modern northeastern boundary near the head of Mitchell Brook, cutting through the southwestern corner of Saint Patrick Parish and leaving the northeastern part of Saint Croix Parish as part of Saint Patrick. Five grants north of the junction of Board Road and Route 760 that are now part of Saint David Parish were also part of Saint Andrews.

In 1874 the northern part of Saint Andrews was erected as Saint Croix, taking all parts of the parish now in Saint Croix, Saint David, and Saint Patrick as well as a bit of territory north of Wileys Corner and land between the railway and the Chamcook Lakes.

In 1958 the modern boundary with Saint Croix was established, transferring everything between the railway and the Chamcook Lakes to Saint Andrews, as well as territory north of Wileys Corner.

Communities
Communities at least partly within the parish. bold indicates an incorporated municipality; italics indicates a name no longer in official use

 Bar Road
 Chamcook (St. Andrews North)
 Chamcook Lake
 Dougherty
 Edwards Corner
 Saint Andrews

Bodies of water
Bodies of water at least partly within the parish.

 St. Croix River
 Pottery Creek
 Passamaquoddy Bay
 St. Andrews Harbour
 Big Bay (on boundary)
 Chamcook Harbour
 Chamcook Channel
 Western Channel
 Chamcook Lake (boundary)
 Kerrs Lake
 Little Chamcook Lake (boundary)

Islands
Islands at least partly within the parish. italics indicates a name no longer in official use
 Ministers Island
 Navy Island (St. Andrews Island)

Other notable places
Parks, historic sites, and other noteworthy places at least partly within the parish.

 Charlotte County Court House
 Charlotte County Gaol
 Charlotte County Registry Office
 Dunn McQuoid House
 Gladstone Smith House
 Hansen House
 Ministers Island Provincial Park
 Minister's Island Wildlife Management Area
 Pagan Point
 St. Andrews Blockhouse National Historic Site
 Sheriff Andrews House Provincial Park

Demographics
Population total does not include the town of Saint Andrews

Population

Language

Access Routes
Highways and numbered routes that run through the parish, including external routes that start or finish at the parish limits:

Highways
None

Principal Routes

Secondary Routes:
None

External Routes:
None

See also
List of parishes in New Brunswick

Notes

References

Parishes of Charlotte County, New Brunswick